Clupeacharax anchoveoides is a species of characiform fish found in Argentina, Bolivia, Brazil, Ecuador and Peru.  It is the only member of its genus.

References
 

Characiformes

Fish of South America
Fish of Argentina
Fish of Bolivia
Fish of Brazil
Fish of Ecuador
Fish of Peru
Fish described in 1924